The nineteenth season of The Bachelor premiered on January 5, 2015. This season featured 33-year-old Chris Soules, a farmer from Arlington, Iowa.

Soules finished in third place on season 10 of The Bachelorette featuring Andi Dorfman. The season concluded on March 9, 2015, with Soules choosing to propose to 29-year-old fertility nurse Whitney Bischoff. They ended their engagement on May 28, 2015.

Production

Casting and contestants
Casting began during the eighteenth season of The Bachelor. Soules and Arie Luyendyk Jr. were the candidates for the next bachelor. On August 26, 2014, Soules was chosen as a fan favorite and was first announced on Good Morning America. Luyendyk later became the star in the twenty-second season.

Notable contestants include Carly Waddell, who is the sister of The Bachelorette season 9 contestant Zak Waddell; professional wrestler Brittany Fetkin; former New York Jets cheerleader Nikki Delventhal; former Washington Redskins Cheerleader Jillian Anderson; and Samantha Steffen, who is the niece of Manoj Bhargava.

Filming and development
Unlike previous seasons, this season premiered with a three-hour live episode. Filming began at The Bachelor mansion in Agoura Hills, California on September 25, 2014. On mid-October, the show was filmed at Deadwood, South Dakota. The season included visits to San Francisco, Santa Fe, New Mexico, Des Moines, Iowa, and the Indonesian island of Bali. Jimmy Kimmel Live! host Jimmy Kimmel took over the hosting role for one episode alongside Chris Harrison and a performance from Big & Rich in week six.

Contestants
The season began with 30 contestants.

Future appearances

Dancing with the Stars
Chris Soules competed in season 20 of Dancing with the Stars, partnering with Witney Carson.  He finished in 5th place. 

Kaitlyn Bristowe competed in season 29 of that show, with partner Artem Chigvintsev, and won.

The Bachelorette
Britt Nilsson and Bristowe were chosen as co-leads for season 11 of The Bachelorette; however, only one would survive past the first night. The men voted for Bristowe to continue as the Bachelorette. Bristowe was named as the interim host for The Bachelorette during seasons 17 and 18 alongside Tayshia Adams, replacing Chris Harrison.

The Bachelor
Amber James and Becca Tilley returned for season 20 of The Bachelor. James was eliminated during week 4 and Tilley in week 7.

Bachelor in Paradise
Season 2

Ashley Salter, Ashley Iaconetti, Carly Waddell, Jade Roper, Jillian Anderson, Juelia Kinney, Megan Bell, James, Samantha Steffen, and Mackenzie Deonigi returned for the second season of Bachelor in Paradise. Anderson was eliminated during week 1, Bell during week 3, Salter and James during week 5. Kinney was also eliminated during week 3 but returned in week 4. Kinney, Iaconetti, and Deonigi quit during week 5. Waddell split from her partner, Kirk DeWindt, during week 6. Roper ended the season engaged to Tanner Tolbert. They were married on January 24, 2016 and have three children together. Steffen left paradise in a relationship with Nick Peterson.

Season 3

Waddell and Iaconetti returned for the third season of Bachelor in Paradise. Iaconetti was eliminated during week 3 but returned in week 4. She split from her partner, Wells Adams, during week 6. Waddell ended the season engaged to Evan Bass. They were married on June 17, 2017 and had two children. They separated in December 2020.

The Bachelor Winter Games
Iaconetti returned for The Bachelor Winter Games under Team USA. She co-won the season alongside Canadian Bachelorette alum, Kevin Wendt.

Call-out order

 The contestant received the first impression rose
 The contestant received a rose during the date
 The contestant was eliminated
 The contestant was originally eliminated but was saved
 The contestant was eliminated during the date
 The contestant quit the competition
 The contestant was eliminated outside of the rose ceremony
 The previously eliminated contestant asked for a chance to return, but was denied
 The contestant moved on to the next week by default
 The contestant won the competition

Episodes

Notes

References

External links

2015 American television seasons
The Bachelor (American TV series) seasons
Television shows filmed in California
Television shows filmed in New Mexico
Television shows filmed in South Dakota
Television shows filmed in Iowa
Television shows filmed in Louisiana
Television shows filmed in Illinois
Television shows filmed in Arizona
Television shows filmed in Nebraska
Television shows filmed in Indonesia